A1 Team Australia was the Australian team of A1 Grand Prix, an international racing series.

Management 
The team chairman is former Formula One world champion Alan Jones, backed by general manager and former NASCAR driver Peter Nolan. The seat is owned by Formula One talent-spotter come principal engineer Alan Docking through his eponymous racing team organisation.

History 

Will Power was the team's driver for the opening round at Brands Hatch, scoring a fourth place in the Sprint Race and a second in the Main Race, beaten only by Nelson Piquet Jr. who dominated the weekend. Power amassed 16 points for these two results; however, he had already signed for Champ Cars' Team Australia and made no further appearance in A1GP. His replacement was seat owner Jones' son Christian Jones, who did not fare so well; round two in Germany provided no points and a best finish of fourteenth place.

The uncompetitive Jones was replaced with Will Davison for round three in Portugal, and despite a qualifying performance of 18th place and a first-lap retirement in the Sprint Race, secured sixth place and five points in the Main Race. Davison was maintained for the home round at Eastern Creek Raceway, and again provided a sixth-place Main Race result. Davison consistently scored better in the Main Race in his drives, securing a one-point tenth place in the UAE round, although retiring from the main race in Durban.

Contract obligations again caused a driver change when Davison switched to V8 Supercars; Australia's fourth driver of the season was Marcus Marshall, who scored the team's first podium since the opening round with a third-place finish in Indonesia. He also moved into V8 Supercars however, and the driver's seat reverted to Christian Jones, who was again uncompetitive.

The seat for the last two rounds was awarded to Ryan Briscoe, who matched Power and Marshall's podium feat in the final round in China, with a main race third-place finish. In total, Australia's best results were a second place and two third places, for a total of 51 points and 13th place in the first-ever A1GP championship.

Although Team Australia managed to secure three podium finishes during the 2006-07 season, they still finished the championship in 13th position with 25 points.

Team Australia finished the 2007–08 season in 17th position, but did manage to score points in both the Sprint and Feature races of their home race.

In the 2008–09 season, Team Australia scored their first ever fastest lap in the final race of the season, however just narrowly missed out on beating New Zealand in the final standings, finishing 8th.

Drivers

Complete A1 Grand Prix results 
(key), "spr" indicates the Sprint Race, "fea" indicates the Feature Race.

References 
A1 GP news story about Ian Dyk

External links 

A1gp.com Official A1 Grand Prix Web Site
Official Team Website - A1 Team Australia

Australia A1 team
Australian auto racing teams
A1
Auto racing teams established in 2005
Auto racing teams disestablished in 2009